The 2017 USL Premier Development League season is the 23rd season of the PDL. The Michigan Bucks entered the season as the defending champions, but their title defense campaign ended with a loss in the Central Conference semi-finals. On August 5, 2017, the Charlotte Eagles won their first PDL championship by defeating the Thunder Bay Chill 2-1.

Changes from 2016

New Teams

Name Changes
FC Miami City Champions became FC Miami City
FC Sonic Lehigh Valley became Lehigh Valley United

Folded/left
Baltimore Bohemians – Folded
Floridians FC – Folded
Kitsap Pumas – renamed Kitsap SC and moved to the National Premier Soccer League
Kokomo Mantis FC – Folded its PDL team
LA Laguna FC – Folded
Laredo Heat – Folded its PDL team
Las Vegas Mobsters – moved to the United Premier Soccer League
Midland/Odessa Sockers – renamed Midland-Odessa FC and moved to the National Premier Soccer League
Pittsburgh Riverhounds U23 – Folded
SW Florida Adrenaline – Folded
Southern West Virginia King's Warriors – Folded its PDL team

Standings

Tiebreakers

 Head-to-head results
 Goal differential
 Goals scored

Central Conference

Great Lakes Division

Heartland Division

Eastern Conference

Northeast Division

Mid Atlantic Division

South Atlantic Division

Southern Conference

Mid South Division

Southeast Division

Western Conference

Mountain Division

Northwest Division

Southwest Division

Playoffs

 After extra time

Divisional Qualification

Matches in the Divisional Qualification round were held on July 18. Two Eastern Conference play-in matches were played at Amesbury, MA (Seacoast United Phantoms) and Whippany, NJ (New York Red Bulls U-23). One Western Conference play-in match was played at Salem, OR (Portland Timbers U23s).

Conference Championships

The PDL Conference Championships were held over the weekend of July 21–23. Matches were played at: Tucson, AZ (Western Conference, host FC Tucson); Statesboro, GA (Eastern Conference, host South Georgia Tormenta FC); Pontiac, MI (Central Conference, host Michigan Bucks); and Clinton, MS (Southern Conference, host Mississippi Brilla FC). The four conference champions advanced to the PDL semifinals.

PDL Championship

The PDL semifinals were held on July 29, with matches played at Charlotte, NC (Charlotte Eagles) and Thunder Bay, ON (Thunder Bay Chill). The PDL Championship Game was held on August 5 in Matthews, NC (Charlotte Eagles).

Awards
 Most Valuable Player: Brian White (NYR)
 Golden Boot: Brian White (NYR)
 Young (U21) Player of the Year: Aaron Molloy (REA)
 Coach of the Year: Robert Elliott (NYR)
 Goalkeeper of the Year: Ben Lundgaard (NYR)
 Defender of the Year: Mitch Osmond (TBC)
 Creative Player of the Year: Harry Pearse (JER)

All-League and All-Conference Teams

Eastern Conference
F: Tobenna Uzo (MYB) *, Brian White (NYR) *, Joao Costa (CHE)
M: Ricardo Gomez (MYB) *, Aaron Molloy (REA) *, Martim Galvão (NAS)
D: Douglas Oliveira (CHE), Alex Nelson (MYB), Kevin Politz (NYR), Daniel Kozma (OCN)
G: Ben Lundgaard (NYR) *

Central Conference
F: Ryan Sierakowski (CHI),  Samuel Gainford (STL), Francis Atuahene (MIB)
M: Abraham Villon (TBC), Amass Amankona (DDL), Chris Mueller (CHI)
D: Mitch Osmond (TBC) *, Nick Walker (MIB) *, Lucas Stauffer (DMM), Brandon Fricke (DMM)
G: Michael Yantz (DDL)

Western Conference
F: Mark Verso (GSF) *, Ryosuke Kinoshita (FCB), Jose Cuevas (FRE)
M: Moshe Perez (TUC) *, Christo Michaelson (POR), Jose Carrera-Garcia (GSF)
D: Sergi Nus (FRE) *, Scott DeVoss (COL) *, Sho Goto (VIC), Wouter Verstraaten (POR)
G: Jordan Farr (POR)

Southern Conference
F: Mohamed Kourouma (MIA), Ricardo Diegues (LAK), Julio Moncada (OKC)
M: Kevin Varela (TBR), Willian Hopfner (VIL), Angelo Kelly-Rosales (MIS)
D: Kevin Coiffic (MIA), Jonathan Parpeix (MIA), Gabriel Torres (VIL), Thomas Vancaeyezeele (MIS)
G: Eric Dick (OKC)

* denotes All-League player

References

USL League Two seasons
2017 in American soccer leagues